This is a list of commemorative coins issued by the Federal Republic of Germany.  For regular coins, see Deutsche Mark and German euro coins.  Those prior to 2002 were denominated in Deutsche Marks; subsequent ones have been denominated in euros.

1950s and 1960s
 100th anniversary of the Germanisches Nationalmuseum in Nuremberg. 5 DM, silver, 1952.
 150th death anniversary of Friedrich von Schiller. 5 DM, silver, 1955.
 300th birthday of Margrave Ludwig Wilhelm of Baden. 5 DM, silver, 1955.
 100th death anniversary of Joseph von Eichendorff. 5 DM, silver, 1957.
 150th death anniversary of Johann Gottlieb Fichte. 5 DM, silver, 1964.
 250th death anniversary of Gottfried Wilhelm Leibniz. 5 DM, silver, 1966.
 200th birthday of Wilhelm and Alexander von Humboldt. 5 DM, silver, 1967.
 150th birthday of Friedrich Wilhelm Raiffeisen. 5 DM, silver, 1968.
 500th death anniversary of Johannes Gutenberg. 5 DM, silver, 1968.
 150th birthday of Max von Pettenkofer. 5 DM, silver, 1968.
 150th birthday of Theodor Fontane. 5 DM, silver, 1969.
 375th death anniversary of Gerhard Mercator. 5 DM, silver, 1969.

1970s
 200th birthday of Ludwig van Beethoven. 5 DM, silver, 1970.
 100th anniversary of the foundation of the German Empire. 5 DM, silver, 1971.
 500th birthday of Albrecht Dürer. 5 DM, silver, 1971.
 1972 Summer Olympics in Munich. 10 DM, silver, 1972. Six different motives: Athletes; Flame; In Deutschland; In München; Schleife; Stadium
 500th birthday of Nicolaus Copernicus. 5 DM, silver, 1973.
 125th anniversary of the Frankfurt National Assembly. 5 DM, silver, 1973.
 25th anniversary of the adoption of the Basic Law. 5 DM, silver, 1974
 250th birthday of Immanuel Kant. 5 DM, silver, 1974.
 50th death anniversary of Friedrich Ebert. 5 DM, silver, 1975.
 100th birthday of Albert Schweitzer. 5 DM, silver, 1975.
 European Year of Monument Protection. 5 DM, silver, 1975.
 300th death anniversary of Hans Jacob Christoph von Grimmelshausen. 5 DM, silver, 1976.
 200th birthday of Carl Friedrich Gauss. 5 DM, silver, 1977.
 200th birthday of Heinrich von Kleist. 5 DM, silver, 1977.
 100th birthday of Gustav Stresemann. 5 DM, silver, 1978.
 225th death anniversary of Balthasar Neumann. 5 DM, silver, 1978.
 150th anniversary of the German Archaeological Institute. 5 DM, silver, 1979.
 100th birthday of Otto Hahn. 5 DM, copper-nickel, 1979.

1980s
 750th death anniversary of Walther von der Vogelweide. 5 DM, copper-nickel, 1980.
 100th anniversary of the completion of Cologne Cathedral. 5 DM, copper-nickel, 1980.
 200th death anniversary of Gotthold Ephraim Lessing. 5 DM, copper-nickel, 1981.
 150th death anniversary of Carl vom Stein. 5 DM, copper-nickel, 1981.
 10th anniversary of the UN Environmental Conference. 5 DM, copper-nickel, 1982.
 150th death anniversary of Johann Wolfgang von Goethe. 5 DM, copper-nickel, 1982.
 100th death anniversary of Karl Marx. 5 DM, copper-nickel, 1983.
 500th birthday of Martin Luther. 5 DM, copper-nickel, 1983.
 150th anniversary of the German Customs Union. 5 DM, copper-nickel, 1984.
 175th birthday of Felix Mendelssohn Bartholdy. 5 DM, copper-nickel, 1984.
 European Year of Music. 5 DM, copper-nickel, 1985.
 150th anniversary of German railroads. 5 DM, copper-nickel, 1985.
 600th anniversary of the University of Heidelberg. 5 DM, copper-nickel, 1986.
 200th death anniversary of Frederick the Great. 5 DM, copper-nickel, 1986.
 750th anniversary of Berlin. 10 DM, silver, 1987.
 30th anniversary of the Treaty of Rome. 10 DM, silver, 1987.
 200th birthday of Arthur Schopenhauer. 10 DM, silver, 1988.
 100th death anniversary of Carl Zeiss. 10 DM, silver, 1988.
 40th anniversary of the Federal Republic of Germany. 10 DM, silver, 1989.
 2,000th anniversary of Bonn. 10 DM, silver, 1989.
 800th anniversary of the port of Hamburg. 10 DM, silver, 1989.

1990s
 800th death anniversary of Barbarossa. 10 DM, silver, 1990.
 800th anniversary of the Teutonic Order. 10 DM, silver, 1990.
 200th anniversary of the Brandenburg Gate. 10 DM, silver, 1991.
 125th birthday of Käthe Kollwitz. 10 DM, silver, 1992.
 150th anniversary of the order Pour le Mérite ("Blue Max"). 10 DM, silver, 1992.
 1,000th anniversary of Potsdam. 10 DM, silver, 1993.
 150th birthday of Robert Koch. 10 DM, silver, 1993.
 50th anniversary of the July 20 Plot to assassinate Hitler. 10 DM, silver, 1994.
 250th birthday of Johann Gottfried Herder. 10 DM, silver, 1994.
 Reconstruction of the Frauenkirche in Dresden. 10 DM, silver, 1995.
 150th birthday of Wilhelm Conrad Röntgen and 100th anniversary of discovery of X-rays. 10 DM, silver, 1995.
 800th death anniversary of Heinrich der Löwe. 10 DM, silver, 1995.
 150th anniversary of the Kolpingwerk. 10 DM, silver, 1996.
 500th birthday of Philipp Melanchthon. 10 DM, silver, 1997.
 100th anniversary of the Diesel engine. 10 DM, silver, 1997.
 200th birthday of Heinrich Heine. 10 DM, silver, 1997.
 350th anniversary of the Peace of Westphalia. 10 DM, silver, 1998.
 900th birthday of Hildegard von Bingen. 10 DM, silver, 1998.
 50th anniversary of the Deutsche Mark. 10 DM, silver, 1998.
 50th anniversary of the Deutsche Mark. 1 DM, gold, 1999.
 300th anniversary of the Stift in Halle. 10 DM, silver, 1998.
 50th anniversary of the Basic Law. 10 DM, silver, 1999.
 50th anniversary of the SOS Children's Villages. 10 DM, silver, 1999.
 Weimar, European City of Culture, and 250th birthday of Johann Wolfgang von Goethe. 10 DM, silver, 1999.

2000s: Marks
 Expo 2000. 10 DM, silver, 2000.
 1,200th anniversary of Charlemagne and the Aachen Cathedral. 10 DM, silver, 2000.
 250th death anniversary of Johann Sebastian Bach. 10 DM, silver, 2000.
 10th anniversary of German reunification. 10 DM, silver, 2000.
 200th birthday of Albert Lortzing. 10 DM, silver, 2001.
 50th anniversary of the Federal Constitutional Court. 10 DM, silver, 2001.
 750th anniversary of the Katharinenkloster and 50th anniversary of the Sea Museum in Stralsund. 10 DM, silver, 2001.

Currencies of Germany
Germany
Coins